The Vilna Soviet of Workers Deputies (abbreviated VDAT) was a soviet (council) in the city of Vilna (Vilnius). Following end of the First World War on November 11, 1918, a political vacuum emerged in Vilna, as the German Ober Ost project crumbled. The pro-communist Vilna Soviet became one of the political forces seeking to govern the city competing with the Lithuanian Taryba and the Polish Samoobrona. A total of 202 deputies were elected to the soviet in December 1918. Whilst the communists formed the largest faction, the Vilna Soviet was politically diverse. Bundists and communists clashed at the first meeting of the soviet. The soviet also did not welcome the Provisional Revolutionary Workers and Peasants Government of Lithuania headed by Vincas Mickevičius-Kapsukas. As such, new elections were organized after Vilna was captured by the Red Army on January 5, 1919 during the Soviet westward offensive of 1918–1919. By allowing Red Army soldiers to vote, the communist reinforced their control of the Vilna Soviet.

December 1918: elections
By late November 1918, communists began preparations for the elections to a workers' soviet. A special commission was set-up to organize elections to the Vilna Soviet. The commission included representatives of the Communist Party of Lithuania and Belorussia, Lithuanian Social Democratic Party, Social Democratic Labour Party of Lithuania and Belorussia (internationalists) (Menshevik-Internationalists), General Jewish Labour Bund,  (Left Socialist-Revolutionaries), Jewish Social Democratic Labour Party (Poalei Zion) and other Jewish socialist groups. The commission circulated the provisional statutes for the Vilna Soviet in the press which gave the Vilna Soviet the function as the central governing authority in Lithuania until an All-Lithuanian Congress of Soviets could be held.

Only members of the trade unions were allowed to vote in the elections. The elections took place amid tensions between the workers, the German authorities, and factory owners. The elections began to be held in early December 1918 – before the withdrawal of the German troops. Among Polish workers there was an active campaign against the soviet election, spearheaded by the newspaper . Nevertheless, the electoral campaign continued. For example, the railway workers union organized a mass meeting, which elected forty delegates (communists and allies) to the Vilna Soviet. Among these delegates was Zigmas Angarietis.

All in all, 202 deputies to the Vilna Soviet were elected. Out of the elected deputies, 96 deputies were from the Communist Party of Lithuania and Belorussia, 60 from the General Jewish Labour Bund, 22 from the Social Democratic Labour Party of Lithuania and Belorussia (internationalists), 15 from the Lithuanian Social Democratic Party, and 9 from other groups (Jewish Social Democratic Labour Party (Poalei Zion), United Jewish Socialist Workers Party, etc).

Proceedings

December 15, 1918: first session
On December 15, 1918, the Vilna Soviet held its inaugural session at the Vilna city hall (the present-day building of the Lithuanian National Philharmonic Society), decorated with red flags and banners with revolutionary slogans. The session was opened with a speech by a veteran labour leader . 

The soviet elected a nine-member presidium of the Vilna Soviet consisting of five communists, three Bundists and one Menshevik-Internationalist. The Communist Party was represented in the Presidium by Pranas Eidukevičius (chairman), Andriejus Novikovas also known as J. Vileiskis (deputy chairman),  (secretary, a former Bundist turned communist), Zigmas Angarietis, and E. Senkevičius.

The meeting declared the Vilna Soviet as the sole governing authority of the city. The gathering declared the end of censorship, banned food exports out of the city, and issued controls on food prices. 

In late 1918, on the suggestion of the Central Committee of the Communist Party of Lithuania and Belorussia, three communists were named as commissars of the Vilna Soviet –  (Commissar for City Economy), K. Rimša (Commissar for Prisons) and J. Vileiskis (Commissar for Railways). The soviet attempted to organize militia to control the railway traffic, including German military trains. This resulted in arrests of 30 deputies of the soviet.

December 22, 1918: second session
On December 22, 1918, the second session of the Vilna Soviet was held. Non-communist groups proposed a motion which refused to cede power to the newly proclaimed Provisional Revolutionary Workers and Peasants Government of Lithuania headed by Vincas Mickevičius-Kapsukas. Instead, the governing power should belong to a Lithuanian congress of Soviets, and that the Executive Committee of the Vilna Soviet would govern until such congress could be called. The Vilna Soviet majority described the Provisional Revolutionary Government as an imposition by "Bolshevik commissars in Moscow". The communist faction rejected the motion, and refused to take part in the vote.

Vilna Soviet adopted a resolution on political prisoners held at Lukiškės Prison: if the prisoners (including 30 deputies of the soviet) were not freed by December 23, 1918, workers would begin a political strike. Since German authorities refused to comply, a general strike began on December 24, 1918. Electricity systems were shut down. By the evening of December 25, 1918, German authorities released the political prisoners and handed over the management of the prison to the Vilna Soviet.

Preparing for an armed confrontation with the Polish legionnaires, the Vilna Soviet proceeded to organize a workers militia. Doctors  and  began organizing a paramedical unit.

December 27, 1918: third session
The third session of the Vilna Soviet was held on December 27, 1918. Around this time, German army was handing over resources (supplies, food, funds, etc.) to the bourgeois Vilna City Duma. The Communist Party presented a motion calling for a confrontation with the bourgeoisie, demanding the transfer of all institutions, resources, and government employees to the Vilna Soviet, and for looters of food stuffs to be court-martialed. The Bund rejected the communist motion, arguing that the struggle should be directed solely against the German occupation forces, not the local bourgeoisie. The Bundists argued that the communist line would bring a civil war. The communist motion was passed with 110 votes in favour.

January 1–2, 1919: shoot-out with Polish Samoobrona 
As German troops retreated from Vilna, Polish Samoobrona attempted to establish its control over the city. On January 1, 1919, Samoobrona surrounded the Vilna Soviet, which had barricaded at the Workers' Club building at 5 Wrona (Varnių) Street (later 9 Komunarai Street, present-day A. Jakštas Street). Inside the building were the Vilna Soviet deputies and some fifty members of the workers' militia. Around 11 pm the leader of the Polish forces, general Władysław Wejtko, issued an ultimatum to surrender which the soviet refused.

The shoot-out lasted for over twelve hours. Cornered in the basement of the building, rather than surrendering  (Raisenas), Leonas Čaplinskas, Jankelis Šapira (Asas), and  used their last remaining bullets to commit suicide. Roman Pilar attempted to shoot himself, but survived.

After the shoot-out, the Polish Samoobrona captured dozens of Vilna Soviet organizers and seized some 1,000 weapons that the revolutionaries had obtained from the retreating German troops. On January 9, 1919, after the Red Army captured Vilna, a ceremonial burial for the deceased members of the Vilna Soviet was organized at the Cathedral Square. During the post-World War II Soviet era, Wrona Street was renamed Komunarai Street in memory of the five men.

February 1919: reorganization
Following the capture of Vilna by the Red Army on January 5, new elections to the Vilna Soviet were held in which Red Army soldiers could take part. As of February 4, 1919, the Vilna Soviet of Workers and Red Army Deputies included 130 communists (in addition to representatives of the Red Army units), 45 representatives of the Bund, 9 Menshevik-Internationalists, 5 Polish Socialist Party of Lithuania and Belorussia, 2 Left Socialist-Revolutionaries, 1 United Jewish Socialist Workers Party, and 4 non-party representatives.

At its first meeting on February 7, 1919, the Vilna Soviet of Workers and Red Army Deputies elected a 20-member Executive Committee which included 16 communists, 3 Bundists, and 1 Menshevik-Internationalist. The Vilna Soviet took charge as the governing authority of city.

On February 18, 1919, Vilna Soviet unanimously adopted a resolution approving the merger of the Lithuanian Soviet Socialist Republic with the Socialist Soviet Republic of Belorussia.

See also
Kaunas Soviet of Workers Deputies

References

Bibliography

 
 
 
 
 
 
 
 
 
 
 
 
 
 
 
 
 

History of Vilnius
1918 in Lithuania
1919 in Lithuania
Communism in Lithuania